Johnsons may refer to:

 Johnsons, California, a settlement in California, US
 The Johnsons, a 1992 Dutch horror film
 The Johnsons, original bandname of UK punk band Pussycat and the Dirty Johnsons
 The Shane Twins, a professional wrestling tag team that once competed under the name "The Johnsons"

See also 
 Johnson, the surname
 Antony and the Johnsons, an American music group
 Johnsons Coach & Bus Travel